The Zois Lodge at Kokra Saddle is a mountain hostel that stands on Kokra Saddle, part of the Kamnik–Savinja Alps. It is named after the brothers Karl Zois (1756–1799), and Sigmund Zois (1747–1819).

The first lodge was built from wood in 1897 by the Austrian hiking club. After World War I it had to be rebuilt.

In 1966, it was expanded and connected via a ropeway conveyor to Konec in the Kamnik Bistrica Valley. The lodge operates from the start of June through the middle of October. The lodge offers Slovenian drinks, such as Cockta, and traditional dishes such as bujta repa.

Starting points
 3½ h: from the Kamnik Bistrica Valley (601 m) (the cableway on the map is only for freight, not people)
 2½ h: from the Suhadolnik Farm in the Kokra Valley (896 m)

Neighbouring lodges
 5 h: to the Czech Lodge at Spodnje Ravni (1,542 m) via the Mlinar Saddle
 5 h: to the Czech Lodge at Spodnje Ravni (1,542 m) via the Dolci Notch Pass
 5½ h: to the Frischauf Lodge at Okrešelj (1,396 m) via Turski Žleb Ravine
 6 h: to the Kamnik Saddle Lodge (1,864 m) via the Sleme Pass and Mount Turska (Turska gora)
 5 h: to the Gospinec Lodge (1,491 m) via the Kalce Plateau
 6 h: to the Gospinec Lodge (1,491 m) via the Kalce Ridge

Neighbouring mountains 
 2 h: Grintovec (2,558 m)
 1 h: Mount Kalce (Kalška gora, 2,047 m)
 2½ h: Kalce Ridge (Kalški greben, 2,224 m)
 3½ h: Kočna (2,540 m)
 3½ h: Skuta (2,532 m)

See also 
 Slovenian Mountain Hiking Trail

References
 Slovenska planinska pot, Planinski vodnik, PZS, 2012, Milenko Arnejšek - Prle, Andraž Poljanec 
 Planinski vestnik, 1898/2
 Fran Lapajne, Planinski vestnik 1921/1
 Kamniško-Savinjske Alpe, vodnik, PZS 2004,

External links 
 Zois Lodge at Kokra Saddle: Description, Route, & Photos
 www.psz.si Zois Lodge at Kokra Saddle

Mountain huts in Slovenia
Kamnik–Savinja Alps